Peter Besanko (born 7 January 1955) is a former Australian racing cyclist. He won the Australian national road race title in 1976 and 1984. He was the first and fastest in the Melbourne to Warrnambool Classic on three occasions, in 1984, 1989 and 1992. He won the Herald Sun Tour in 1976.

References

External links

1955 births
Living people
Australian male cyclists
Cyclists from Melbourne